This is a list of automated people mover systems located at airport complexes around the world. These systems are used to transport people from one location within an airport to another. Many different types of people movers are used at airports, including automated guideway transit, monorail, and maglev.

Africa

Americas

Asia

Europe

Defunct

See also
 List of airport rail link systems

Notes

References

Resources
Guidebook for Planning and Implementing Automated People Mover Systems at Airports - Planning Manual for implementing airport people mover systems

 
Airport people mover systems